Encore is the fourth studio album by American musician Anderson East. It was released in January 2018, under Elektra Records. "All on my Mind" earned East his first Grammy Award nomination for Best American Roots Performance.

Critical reception
Encore was met with "generally favorable" reviews from critics. At Metacritic, which assigns a weighted average rating out of 100 to reviews from mainstream publications, this release received an average score of 74, based on 7 reviews.

Accolades

Track listing

Personnel
Musicians
 Anderson East – lead vocals (all tracks), electric guitar (2–4, 7, 9), hand clap (4)
 Dave Cobb – acoustic guitar (1, 3, 4, 9), horn arrangement (1, 3, 4, 6), percussion (2, 4, 6, 7), electric guitar (3–5, 8), hand clap (4), bass (6, 7)
 Kristen Rogers – background vocals (1, 2, 4–9, 11)
 Brian Allen – bass (1–3, 5, 8, 9), hand clap (4)
 Chris Powell – drums (1–9), congas (1), percussion (4, 6, 7, 9), bass (8)
 Chris Stapleton – electric guitar (1, 4)
 Ben Clark – horn arrangement (1, 3, 4, 6), trumpet (1, 3, 4, 6, 7)
 Nate Heffron – horn arrangement (1, 3, 4, 6), saxophone (1, 3, 4, 6, 7)
 Philip Townes – organ (1, 3, 4, 7, 8, 11), keyboards (2, 5, 7, 9), Mellotron (3, 8), piano (3, 6, 9, 11), hand clap (4), Moog (4, 6), synthesizer (8)
 Ryan Adams – lead electric guitar (2)
 Mark Neill – percussion (2), tambourine (8)
 Emily Nelson – cello (3, 8, 9)
 Kristin Wilkinson – string arrangement, viola (3, 8, 9)
 David Angell – violin (3, 8, 9)
 David Davidson – violin (3, 8, 9)
 Zach Williams – background vocals (4)
 Tim Bergling – piano (6)

Technical
 Dave Cobb – production
 Greg Nadel – production (8)
 Pete Lyman – mastering
 Eddie Spear – mixing (1–7, 9), engineering (2, 4–8)
 Mark Neill – mixing (2), additional production (8)
 Michael Brauer – mixing (8)
 Matt Ross-Spang – engineering (1, 3, 4, 7, 9)
 Brandon Bell – engineering (3)
 Charlie Stavish – additional recording (2)
 Gena Johnson – engineering assistance

Charts

References

2018 albums
Elektra Records albums